The Khmer Democratic Party (KDP) is a Cambodian political party.

Political ideology

This political party supports the belief that while illegal immigrants and even those ‘’from Vietnam’’ who ‘’take jobs from Cambodians’’ are destructive to Cambodia. The KDP’s leader Uk Phourik says he and his party do not support the ideology of ‘’anti-immigration’’ however he and the Khmer Democratic Party support and promote the belief that ‘’all immigrants’’ must ‘’on a case by case basis’’ need to become citizens only ‘’by royal decree’’ in order to live in Cambodia where they could constructively contribute to Cambodia as well.

Other ideologies the Khmer Democratic Party promotes and supports are human-rights ‘’particularly for women and children’’ and giving unlimited support to ‘’a free market economy’’ and also being unbiased by supporting and ‘’co-operating’’ with all the countries of the world ‘’regardless of their socio-political policies.’’ Apart from that there is also the party supports the belief of all Cambodians having control over their country by ‘’sovereignty.’’

Other ideologies the party supports is for example its conservative support of cultural heritage and social morality as well as Constitutional law which means they oppose the following like thievery, drug and human trafficking, etc.

Political activities
Of the many television campaign programs showing political parties promoting their views, the Khmer Democratic Party got 1 hour 48 minutes which was more time on than the ruling Cambodian People's Party time which was 1 hour 43 minutes.
 The KDP had come in seventh place in the 2008 Cambodian parliamentary elections with 32,386 votes with 1 seat.

References

1988 establishments in Cambodia
Cambodian democracy movements
Monarchist parties in Cambodia
Nationalist parties in Cambodia
Political parties established in 1988
Political parties in Cambodia